The 14265/14266 Varanasi–Dehradun Express is Express train belonging to Indian Railways, that runs between  and  in India.

It operates as train number 14265 from Varanasi Junction to Dehradun and as train number 14266 in the reverse direction.

Coaches
The 14265/14266 Varanasi–Dehradun Express presently has 1 AC 2 tier, 1 AC 3 tier, 8 Sleeper class and 9 Unreserved/General coaches. It does not carry a pantry car.

As with most train services in India, coach composition may be amended at the discretion of Indian Railways depending on demand.

Service
The 14265 Varanasi–Dehradun Express covers the distance of 846 kilometres in 22 hours 05 mins (38.31 km/hr) & in 21 hours 25 mins (39.50 km/hr) as 14266 Dehradun–Varanasi Express.

As the average speed of the train is below , as per Indian Railways rules, its fare does not include a Superfast surcharge.

Traction

It is hauled by Lucknow-based WAP-7 locomotive for its entire run.

Timetable
14265 Varanasi–Dehradun Janta Express leaves Varanasi Junction daily at 08:30 hrs IST and reaches Dehradun at 06:35 hrs IST the next day.

14266 Dehradun–Varanasi Janta Express leaves Dehradun daily at 18:20 hrs IST and reaches Varanasi Junction at 15:45 hrs IST the next day.

Train accident

On 20 March 2015 train number 14266 derailed in Bachhrawa near Rae Bareli at 09:10 in the morning. It was returning from Dehradun to Varanasi. As per sources 38 people died while more than 200 injured. The central government offered ₹200000 compensation for dead,₹50000 for seriously injured and ₹20000 for minor injured people. According to Indian Railways the main cause of the accident was the failure of train's braking system.

References

External links
 Indianrail.gov.in
 Irctc.co.in
 Irfca.org
 Dainik Jagran Hindi newspaper, Gorakhpur, 21 March 2015, page 1

Passenger trains originating from Varanasi
Trains from Dehradun
Express trains in India